Trinity High School is a Catholic, all-boys, college preparatory high school located in St. Matthews, Kentucky, a city within Louisville Metro (consolidated city/county government).  It is located in the Roman Catholic Archdiocese of Louisville.  The school incorporates the Catholic tradition of teaching and learning.  The school campus comprises about 1,200 students.  In 1992, Trinity was named a Blue Ribbon School of Excellence.  In 1995, Trinity was accredited by the non-profit Southern Association of Colleges and Schools (now known as AdvancED).

History
Trinity opened its doors in 1953, when Archbishop John Floersh anticipated the growth of Louisville's eastern suburbs by choosing the site of Holy Trinity School, a former Roman Catholic church and grade school in St. Matthews.  The school was formerly owned by the Roman Catholic Archdiocese of Louisville; however, Trinity is now sponsored by the Archdiocese, owned by the Trinity High School Foundation, Incorporated and governed by the Trinity High School Board, and managed and operated by the administration and faculty.  The school is named after the Christian doctrine of the Trinity, which holds that God is three consubstantial persons.  The school was founded with the intent to eventually become self-sufficient over time.  Trinity's first class graduated in 1957.

Campus

On September 1, 1882, Bishop William McClosky established a new parish for the benefit of the farming community of St. Matthews.  Until that time, Catholics went into the city for Mass and other liturgical services.  This new parish, named Holy Trinity, was the first Catholic Church in eastern Jefferson County, and the twentieth in the area.  The Church was dedicated on December 17, 1882.  After outgrowing the first church, a second church was built.  This second church was heavily damaged by fire in 1937 but was renovated and used until 1953.  At that time, the parish donated its property to the Archdiocese for the purpose of establishing Trinity High School.  The property also originally contained two buildings which would later be named Floersh Hall and Old Trinity Hall.  Before the school opened in the fall of 1953, Shamrock Hall and the Trinity Football Field were added to the campus, as well as a rectory for the resident priest.  In 1968, the Trinity Campus was expanded to include Sheehan Hall, which is connected to the main building.

In 1999, construction of the R.W. Marshall Sports Center was completed and serves as the hub for Trinity Athletics.  In 2001, Alumni Hall was added to the main building, which serves as the school's cafeteria and administrative hub, as well as hosting the Trinity Campus Store. The Trinity Campus expanded again in 2004 to include the third expansion to the main building, Duerr Hall.

In November 2004, it was announced that Trinity would be razing its athletic stadium to build a brand new one at the end of the season.  The R.W. Marshall Stadium was constructed between December 2004 and May 2005, at a cost of $3 million (equivalent to $ million in ).

Other buildings on the Trinity Campus include the Communication Arts Center, which holds Convocation Hall, and the Trinity Theatre.

Student body

Demographics

The ethnic makeup of Trinity's student body was classified in 2015 by the United States Department of Education as being "overwhelmingly white", with 7.7% of students being African American.  Other minorities include Asians (0.7%), Hispanic (1.3%), and students identifying as mixed race (4.7%). All minority students make up a combined 11.2% of the student body.

Athletics

The Trinity Athletics Department participates in 14 KHSAA sanctioned sports and KSHAA sports activities.  Trinity also participates in five club sports.

Notable alumni

Athletics
Baseball
 Corey Littrell, pitcher
 Trever Miller, pitcher
 Jimmy Osting, pitcher
Basketball
 Ray Spalding, forward
 David Johnson, guard
 Jay Scrubb, forward
Figure skating
 Ernie Utah Stevens, pair skater
Football
 Rob Bironas, kicker
 Brian Brohm, quarterback
 Jeff Brohm, quarterback, Louisville head coach
 Dalyn Dawkins, running back
 Carwell Gardner, running back
 Donnie Gardner, defensive end
 Rondale Moore, wide receiver
 Reggie Bonnafon, wide receiver
 Steve Raible, wide receiver, later a news anchor for KIRO-TV and play-by-play radio commentator for the Seattle Seahawks

Soccer
 John Michael Hayden, soccer player, head coach of University of Louisville

Politics and law
 Greg Fischer, Mayor of Louisville since 2011
 Bob Heleringer, member of the Kentucky House of Representatives 1980–2002
 Todd Hollenbach, Kentucky State Treasurer 2008–2016, State 30th District Court judge since 2016

Others
 Steve Crump, television reporter for WBTV
 Gary J. Sullivan, video engineer
 Troy Yocum, activist and fundraiser for veteran's issues

See also
 List of schools in Louisville, Kentucky
 Trinity murders

References

External links
 Trinity High School website

Boys' schools in Kentucky
Roman Catholic Archdiocese of Louisville
Educational institutions established in 1953
Catholic secondary schools in Kentucky
1953 establishments in Kentucky
Schools in Jefferson County, Kentucky
St. Matthews, Kentucky